Estudios Filológicos is an academic journal published by the Humanities and Philosophy Faculty of the Southern University of Chile. It covers a wide range of linguistics and literature-related topics, primarily on issues that are relevant to Iberoamerica.

Abstracting and indexing 
The journal is abstracted and indexed in Current Contents/Arts and Humanities, Current Contents/Social & Behavioral Sciences, Arts and Humanities Citation Index, Social Sciences Citation Index, Linguistics and Language Behavior Abstracts, MLA International Bibliography, International Bibliography of Periodical Literature, and International Bibliography of Book Reviews.

External links 
 

Philology journals
Chilean literature
Austral University of Chile academic journals
Publications established in 1975
Multilingual journals